Henhenet was an ancient Egyptian queen consort, a lower ranking wife of Pharaoh Mentuhotep II of the 11th dynasty. Her tomb (DBXI.11) and small decorated chapel were found in her husband's Deir el-Bahari temple complex, behind the main building, along with the tombs of five other ladies, Ashayet, Kawit, Kemsit, Sadeh and Mayet. Most of them were priestesses of Hathor, so it is possible that they were buried there as part of the goddess's cult, but it is also possible that they were the daughters of nobles the king wanted to keep an eye upon.

Unlike the sarcophagi of the other queens, hers was not decorated, only a single line of inscription runs on both sides. Her mummy shows that she died in childbirth when she was about 21 years old. Her mummy is now in the Egyptian Museum in Cairo, her sarcophagus is in New York City.

Her titles were: King's Beloved Wife (ḥmt-nỉswt mrỉỉ.t=f ), King's Ornament (ẖkr.t-nỉswt), King's Sole Ornament (ẖkr.t-nỉswt wˁtỉ.t), Priestess of Hathor (ḥm.t-nṯr ḥwt-ḥrw).

Sources

21st-century BC Egyptian people
21st-century BC women
Deaths in childbirth
Queens consort of the Eleventh Dynasty of Egypt
Egyptian Museum
Ancient Egyptian mummies 
Mentuhotep II
Hathor